Alidu Seidu (born 4 June 2000) is a Ghanaian professional footballer who plays as a defender for Ligue 1 club Clermont and the Ghana national football team.

Club career
On 1 June 2019, Seidu joined Clermont Foot from the JMG Academy. He made his debut with Clermont in a 1–1 Ligue 2 draw with Toulouse FC on 19 September 2020.

References

External links

 

2000 births
Living people
Ghanaian footballers
Association football defenders
Ghana international footballers
Ligue 1 players
Ligue 2 players
Championnat National 3 players
JMG Academy players
Clermont Foot players
Ghanaian expatriate footballers
Ghanaian expatriate sportspeople in France
Expatriate footballers in France
2022 FIFA World Cup players